Mauro Jöhri (born 1 September 1947 in Bivio, Graubünden, Switzerland) is a Swiss Roman Catholic friar and theologian. He was the Minister General of the Order of Friars Minor Capuchin, having served from 2006 to 2018 (following re-election in 2012). He is also a Professor of Theology.

Father Jöhri is fluent in German, Romansh, French and Italian, the four languages of Switzerland. He joined his order in 1964 as a novice, and studied Theology at the order's seminary in Solothurn. He was ordained a priest in 1972, and continued his studies in Fribourg, Tübingen and Lucerne, where he earned a doctorate with a dissertation on the work of Hans Urs von Balthasar.

In the following years, he lived in the monastery of Madonna del Sasso in Locarno, where he was active as a teacher. Subsequently, he taught dogmatic theology and fundamental theology at the theological seminary in Chur, and served as a Professor of Theology at the University of Lugano.

He became the minister provincial of  the Swiss branch of his order in 1995. He also undertook studies at the Institut de formation humaine intégrale in Montreal, Canada, before returning to his post as provincial superior, eventually being elected as minister general in 2006.

Publications 
 Descensus Dei: teologia della croce nell'opera di Hans Urs von Balthasar. Roma: Libr. Ed. della Pontificia Univ. Lateranense 1981 (dissertation, Lucerne, 1980)
 Hans Urs von Balthasar (1905-1988): eine katholische "dialektische Theologie". In: Stephan Leimgruber und Max Schoch (ed.): Gegen die Gottvergessenheit: Schweizer Theologen im 19. und 20. Jahrhundert. Basel: Herder 1990, pp. 420–439

References 

1947 births
Living people
Swiss Roman Catholics
Swiss Friars Minor
Capuchins
General Vicars and Ministers General of the Order of Friars Minor Capuchin